Aquatics at the 1985 Southeast Asian Games included swimming, diving and water polo events. The three sports of aquatics were held at Aquatic Centre in Sport Authority of Thailand Sport Complex, Bangkok, Thailand. Aquatics events was held between 9 December to 12 December.

Medal winners

Swimming
Men's events

Women's events

Diving

Water polo

References
BASOC (1985) 13th SEA Games Official Report, Thailand

1985
1985 Southeast Asian Games
S